James Dale Todd (born March 20, 1943 or May 29, 1943) is a senior United States district judge of the United States District Court for the Western District of Tennessee.

Education and career

Born in Scotts Hill, Tennessee, Todd received a Bachelor of Science degree from Lambuth University in 1965, a Master of Combined Sciences from the University of Mississippi in 1968, and a Juris Doctor from the Cecil C. Humphreys School of Law at the University of Memphis in 1972. He was in private practice in Jackson, Tennessee from 1972 to 1983. He was a Circuit judge of the State of Tennessee from 1983 to 1985.

Federal judicial service

On June 5, 1985, Todd was nominated by President Ronald Reagan to a new seat on the United States District Court for the Western District of Tennessee created by 98 Stat. 333. He was confirmed by the United States Senate on July 10, 1985, and received his commission the following day. He served as Chief Judge from 2001 to 2007, assuming senior status on May 20, 2008. Judge Todd assumed inactive status on the 21st of September, 2021. He served the judiciary for 36 years.

References

Sources
 

1943 births
Living people
Lambuth University alumni
University of Mississippi alumni
University of Memphis alumni
Judges of the United States District Court for the Western District of Tennessee
United States district court judges appointed by Ronald Reagan
20th-century American judges
People from Scotts Hill, Tennessee
21st-century American judges